Anacapri is a comune on the island of Capri, in the Metropolitan City of Naples, Italy.

Anacapri is located higher on the island than Capri (about  higher on average)—the Ancient Greek prefix ana- meaning "up" or "above". Administratively, it maintains a separate status from the comune of Capri.

Anacapri is widely known for its picturesque, rural tranquility, broad views of the Bay of Naples, and significant historic sites, including Villa San Michele.

Overview
Bus and taxi services connect Marina Grande to Capri and Anacapri via the numerous hairpin turns of Via Giuseppe Orlandi.

A chairlift in Anacapri (seggiovia) connects Piazza Vittoria to the  Monte Solaro, providing wide views of the south-facing coast.

French composer Claude Debussy named one of the pieces from his first book of preludes—No. 5, "Les collines d'Anacapri" ("The Hills of Anacapri")—in homage to the community.

Notable landmarks 
 Casa Caprile
 Castello Barbarossa
 Belvedere della Migliera (or Migliara)
 Casa Rossa
 Chiesa di San Michele
 Chiesa di Santa Sofia
 Eremo di Santa Maria a Cetrella
 Le Boffe
 Sentiero dei fortini
 Phoenician Steps (Scala Fenicia)
 Monte Solaro
 Punta Carena Lighthouse 
 Casa Cernia di Luigi Cosenza
 Villa Damecuta
 Blue Grotto

Gallery

See also
Blue Grotto
City of Capri
Capri island

References

Cities and towns in Campania
Capri, Campania